Olduvai may refer to:

Olduvai Gorge
Seven Views of Olduvai Gorge
Olduvai Gorge Museum
Olduvai Hominid 8
Olduvai theory
DUF1220, aka Olduvai domain; a protein domain
Olduvai, Research Facility on Mars in the Doom (film)

See also
 Oldowan